Chang Chin-lan is a Taiwanese actress.

Filmography

Film

Television series

References

External links

 
 

1988 births
21st-century Taiwanese actresses
Actresses from Taipei
Living people